The Grande Premio Presidente Emilio Medici was a non-championship Formula One race held on 3 February 1974 to inaugurate a new racing facility in Brasilia, the Autódromo Emilio Medici. Carlos Reutemann qualified on pole and Emerson Fittipaldi set fastest lap and won. The race was held only this once.

Qualifying

Classification

References

1974 Formula One races